Motion Painting No. 1 (1947) is a short animated film in which film artist Oskar Fischinger put images in motion to the music of Johann Sebastian Bach's Brandenburg Concerto no. 3, BWV 1048.

The film was created by applying oil paint on acrylic glass. Fischinger filmed each brushstroke over the course of 9 months. In 1997, the film was selected for inclusion in the United States National Film Registry by the Library of Congress as being "culturally, historically, or aesthetically significant". The Academy Film Archive preserved Motion Painting No. 1 in 2000, though they do not have distribution rights.

References

Further reading
 The original acrylic glass panels are at the Deutsches Filmmuseum in Frankfurt, Germany.
 William Moritz, Optical Poetry: The Life and Work of Oskar Fischinger (London: John Libbey & Company Ltd., and Bloomington: Indiana University Press, 2004)

External links
 
 FilmAffinity

1947 films
United States National Film Registry films
American avant-garde and experimental films
Paint-on-glass animated films
Visual music
American animated short films
1947 animated films
1940s American animated films